Karl Paul Polanyi (25 October 1886 – 23 April 1964), was an Austro-Hungarian economic anthropologist and politician, best known for his book The Great Transformation, which questions the conceptual validity of self-regulating markets. 

In his writings, Polanyi advances the concept of the Double Movement, which refers to the dialectical process of marketization and push for social protection against that marketization. He argues that market-based societies in modern Europe were not inevitable but historically contingent. Polanyi is remembered best as the originator of substantivism, a cultural version of economics, which emphasizes the way economies are embedded in society and culture. This opinion is counter to mainstream economics but is popular in anthropology, economic history, economic sociology and political science.

Polanyi's approach to the ancient economies has been applied to a variety of cases, such as Pre-Columbian America and ancient Mesopotamia, although its utility to the study of ancient societies in general has been questioned. Polanyi's The Great Transformation became a model for historical sociology. His theories eventually became the foundation for the economic democracy movement.

Polanyi was active in politics, and helped found the National Citizens' Radical Party in 1914, serving as its secretary.

Early life
Polanyi was born into a Jewish family. His younger brother was Michael Polanyi, a philosopher, and his niece was Eva Zeisel, a world-renowned ceramist. He was born in Vienna, at the time the capital of the Austro-Hungarian Empire. His father, Mihály Pollacsek, was a railway entrepreneur. Mihály never changed the name Pollacsek, and is buried in the Jewish cemetery in Budapest. Mihály died in January 1905, which was an emotional shock to Karl, and he commemorated the anniversary of Mihály's death throughout his life. Karl and Michael Polanyi's mother was Cecília Wohl. The name change to Polanyi (not von Polanyi) was made by Karl and his siblings. Polanyi was well educated despite the ups and downs of his father's fortune, and he immersed himself in Budapest's active intellectual and artistic scene.

Early career

Polanyi founded the radical and influential Galileo Circle while at the University of Budapest, a club which would have far reaching effects on Hungarian intellectual thought. During this time, he was actively engaged with other notable thinkers, such as György Lukács, Oszkár Jászi, and Karl Mannheim. Polanyi graduated from Budapest University in 1912 with a doctorate in Law. In 1914, he helped found the National Citizens' Radical Party of Hungary and served as its secretary.

Polanyi was a cavalry officer in the Austro-Hungarian Army in World War I, in active service at the Russian Front and hospitalized in Budapest. Polanyi supported the republican government of Mihály Károlyi and its Social Democratic regime. The republic was short-lived, however, and when Béla Kun toppled the Karolyi government to create the Hungarian Soviet Republic, Polanyi left for Vienna.

In Vienna 
From 1924 to 1933, he was employed as a senior editor of the prestigious Der Österreichische Volkswirt (The Austrian Economist) magazine. It was at this time that he first began criticizing the Austrian School of economists, who he felt created abstract models which lost sight of the organic, interrelated reality of economic processes. Polanyi himself was attracted to Fabianism and the works of G. D. H. Cole. It was also during this period that Polanyi grew interested in Christian socialism.

He married the communist revolutionary Ilona Duczyńska, of Polish-Hungarian background. Their daughter Kari Polanyi Levitt carried on the family tradition of economic academic research.

In London 
Polanyi was asked to resign from Der Oesterreichische Volkswirt because the liberal publisher of the journal could not keep on a prominent socialist after the accession of Hitler to office in January 1933 and the suspension of the Austrian parliament by the rising tide of clerical fascism in Austria. He left for London in 1933, where he earned a living as a journalist and tutor and obtained a position as a lecturer for the Workers' Educational Association in 1936. His lecture notes contained the research for what later became The Great Transformation. However, he would not start writing this work until 1940, when he moved to Vermont to take up a position at Bennington College. The book was published in 1944, to great acclaim. In it, Polanyi described the enclosure process in England and the creation of the contemporary economic system at the beginning of the 19th century.

United States and Canada 
Polanyi joined the staff of Bennington College in 1940, teaching a series of five timely lectures on the "Present Age of Transformation.". The lectures "The Passing of the 19th Century", "The Trend Towards an Integrated Society", "The Breakdown of the International System", "Is America an Exception" and "Marxism and the Inner History of the Russian Revolution" took place during the early stages of World War II. Polanyi participated in Bennington's Humanism Lecture Series (1941) and Bennington College's Lecture Series (1943) where his topic was "Jean Jacques Rousseau: Or Is a Free Society Possible?"

After the war, Polanyi received a teaching position at Columbia University (1947–1953). However, his wife, Ilona Duczyńska (1897–1978), had a background as a former communist, which made gaining an entrance visa in the United States impossible. As a result, they moved to Canada, and Polanyi commuted to New York City. In the early 1950s, Polanyi received a large grant from the Ford Foundation to study the economic systems of ancient empires.

Having described the emergence of the modern economic system, Polanyi now sought to understand how "the economy" emerged as a distinct sphere in the distant past. His seminar at Columbia drew several famous scholars and influenced a generation of teachers, resulting in the 1957 volume Trade and Market in the Early Empires. Polanyi continued to write in his later years and established a new journal entitled Coexistence. In Canada he lived in Pickering, Ontario, where he died in 1964.

Selected works 
 "Socialist Accounting" (1922)
 The Essence of Fascism (1933–1934); article
 The Great Transformation (1944)
 "Universal Capitalism or Regional Planning?", The London Quarterly of World Affairs, vol. 10 (3) (1945)
 Trade and Market in the Early Empires (1957, edited and with contributions by others)
 Dahomey and the Slave Trade (1966)
 George Dalton (ed), Primitive, Archaic, and Modern Economics: Essays of Karl Polanyi (New York: Doubleday & Company, 1968); collected essays and selections from his work.
 Harry W. Pearson (ed.), The Livelihood of Man (Academic Press, 1977)
 Karl Polanyi, For a New West: Essays, 1919–1958 (Polity Press, 2014), 
Gareth Dale (ed), Karl Polanyi: The Hungarian Writings (Manchester University Press, 2016)

See also
 Michael Polanyi (brother)
 John Polanyi (nephew)
 Eva Zeisel (cousin)

Notes

References 

 
 
Dale, Gareth (2016), Reconstructing Karl Polanyi, Pluto Press, ISBN 978-0745335186

Further reading
 Robert Kuttner, "The Man from Red Vienna" (review of Gareth Dale, Karl Polanyi: A Life on the Left, Columbia University Press, 381 pp.), The New York Review of Books, vol. LXIV, no. 20 (21 December 2017), pp. 55–57. "In sum, Polanyi got some details wrong, but he got the big picture right. Democracy cannot survive an excessively free market; and containing the market is the task of politics. To ignore that is to court fascism. (Robert Kuttner, p. 57.)

External links 

 Karl Polanyi Digital Archive
 The Karl Polanyi Institute of Political Economy – The Karl Polanyi Institute of Political Economy at Concordia University web site.
 Karl Polanyi Wiki
 Karl Polanyi, The Great Transformation: The Political and Economic Origins of Our Time (1944) Review Essay by Anne Mayhew, College of Arts and Sciences, University of Tennessee
 Profile on Karl Polanyi – On the History of Economic Thought Website
 The free market is an impossible utopia (2014-07-18), The Washington Post. A conversation with Fred Block and Margaret Somers on their book, The Power of Market Fundamentalism: Karl Polanyi’s Critique (Harvard University Press, 2014). The book argues that the ideas of Karl Polanyi are crucial to help understand economic recessions and their aftermath.
  – Why Two Karls Are Better Than One: Integrating Polyani and Marx in a Critical Theory of the Current Crisis by Nancy Fraser
 

1886 births
1964 deaths
20th-century anthropologists
20th-century  Hungarian economists
20th-century essayists
20th-century Hungarian historians
20th-century Hungarian philosophers
Austro-Hungarian Jews
Burials at Kerepesi Cemetery
Economic historians
Historical school economists
Columbia University faculty
Hungarian anthropologists
Hungarian Christian socialists
Hungarian essayists
Hungarian expatriates in Austria
Hungarian nobility
Hungarian socialists
Hungarian sociologists
Jewish historians
Jewish philosophers
Jewish sociologists
Jewish anthropologists
Liberal socialism
People from Pickering, Ontario
Philosophers of culture
Philosophers of economics
Philosophers of history
Philosophers of social science
Karl
Social philosophers
Socialist economists
Writers from Vienna
Jewish emigrants from Austria to the United Kingdom after the Anschluss